This is a list of minister from Arjun Munda cabinets starting from 18 March 2003 – 2 March 2005. Arjun Munda is the leader of Bharatiya Janata Party was sworn in the Chief Ministers of Jharkhand on 18 March 2003. Here is the list of the ministers of his ministry.

Arjun Munda along with five minister, took oath of office on 18 March, one minister from Bharatiya Janata Party, one minister from  Jharkhand Vanachal Congress and two from minister from All Jharkhand Students Union as well as one Independent.

Ministers

See also 

 Government of Jharkhand
 Jharkhand Legislative Assembly
 Second Arjun Munda ministry
 Arjun Munda third ministry

References

Bharatiya Janata Party state ministries
All Jharkhand Students Union
2003 in Indian politics
Jharkhand ministries
2003 establishments in Jharkhand
2005 disestablishments in India
Cabinets established in 2003
Cabinets disestablished in 2005